Lake El'gygytgyn (Russian and Chukchi: Эльгыгытгын) is an impact crater lake located in the Chukotka Autonomous Okrug in northeast Siberia, about  southeast of Chaunskaya Bay.

The word "Elgygytgyn" means "white lake" in the Chukchi language.

The lake is of particular interest to scientists because it has never been covered by glaciers.

Geography

Lake El'gygytgyn is located in the Anadyr Plateau, part of the Anadyr Highlands. It is drained to the southeast by the Enmyvaam, a tributary of the Belaya. The lake is centered within an impact crater with a rim diameter of  that formed 3.6 million years ago during the Pliocene. Before it was reliably dated, preliminary papers in the late 1970s suggested either Elgygytgyn or Zhamanshin as the source of the young Australasian strewnfield.

Scientific drilling 
In late 2008 and early 2009, an international team from the US (Dr. Julie Brigham-Grette), Germany (Dr. Martin Melles), Russia (Dr. Pavel Sergeevich Minuyk) and Austria (Dr. Christian Koeberl) conducted a drilling program targeting three holes in El'gygytgyn Lake. The resulting cores are designated ICPD Site 5011-1 and 5011-3. This co-sponsored by the International Continental Scientific Drilling Program (ICDP), with funding also provided by the U.S. National Science Foundation (NSF), the German Federal Ministry of Education and Research (BMBF), Alfred Wegener Institute (AWI) and GeoForschungsZentrum Potsdam (GFZ), the Russian Academy of Sciences Far East Branch (RAS FEB), the Russian Foundation for Basic Research (RFBR), and the Austrian Federal Ministry of Science and Research (BMWF).

Fauna
The conditions in the El'gygytgyn lake are extremely severe for fish life. Even so, there are three species permanently inhabiting the lake's harsh aquatic environment. These are three types of char: Salvelinus boganidae, S. elgyticus (Small-mouth char) and Salvethymus svetovidovi (long-finned char). The two latter species are endemic to the El'gygytgyn lake. The golets (Salvelinus alpinus) has been introduced recently. Fish species in the lake are adapted to its very cold waters, which are generally just above the freezing point, and spend most of the year in total darkness. The surface is frozen for about 10 months of the year. It may start to melt in the summer, but some years it never fully thaws.

See also
List of lakes of Russia

References

External links
 Dr. Matt Nolan at the University of Alaska Fairbanks
 Polar Expedition to Siberian Lake will Yield Details of Past Climate PhysOrg.com.
 NASA Earth Observatory
 Haltia E. M., Nowaczyk N. R. Magnetostratigraphy of sediments from Lake El’gygytgyn ICDP Site 5011-1: paleomagnetic age constraints for the longest paleoclimate record from the continental Arctic, 2014.

Impact craters of Russia
Elgygytgyn
Pliocene
Landforms of Chukotka Autonomous Okrug
Impact craters of the Arctic
Impact crater lakes